Leptospermum gregarium is a species of shrub that is endemic to eastern Australia. Its young stems are hairy the leaves are egg-shaped to lance-shaped with the narrower end towards the base, the flowers are white and arranged singly or in pairs on short side branches and the fruit remain on the plant at maturity. It usually grows in dense stands in swamps or along rocky creeks in high altitude place in northern New South Wales and south-eastern Queensland.

Description
Older stems have bark that is shed in strips or small flakes and younger stems are covered with fine hairs. Flowering mainly occurs from November to December and the fruit is a capsule mostly  in diameter and remain on the plant at maturity.

Taxonomy
The specific epithet (gregarium) refers to the tendency of this species to grow in dense stands.

Distribution and habitat
Leptospermum gregarium grows in swamps and along rocky creeks in high altitude areas of New South Wales north from Nundle and of the Granite Belt in south-east Queensland.

References

gregarium
Myrtales of Australia
Flora of New South Wales
Flora of Queensland
Plants described in 1989